Maurice Leonard Roe (born 11 January 1932) is an English retired professional football wing half who played in the Football League for Brentford. He later returned to Brentford in 1978, to coach the junior team.

Personal life 
Roe's brother, Don, played alongside him for the Brentford reserve team.

Career statistics

References

1932 births
English footballers
English Football League players
Brentford F.C. players
Living people
Footballers from Hayes, Hillingdon
Association football wing halves
Tokyngton Manor F.C. players
Brentford F.C. non-playing staff
Hillingdon Borough F.C. players
Southern Football League players